Bradley King ( – August 24, 1977) was the pen name of Josephine McLaughlin. She was a screenwriter who wrote 56 scripts for films between 1920 and 1947. All but one of her 40 silent films are lost, but most of her 20 or so sound films still exist.

Biography 
King was educated at the Convent of the Sacred Heart in Albany, New York.

King recalled that she entered the business after selling a few short stories to pulp magazines and arranged a meeting with Thomas Ince. "I've read some of your stuff and I think your literary style is absolutely lousy," she later recounted Ince saying. "But you've got a good sense of drama, and I'll give you $50 a week." Five years later, she was making $1,500 a week.

She was married several times. One was a short marriage to silent film director John Griffith Wray, who died just nine months after their October 1928 wedding. After a later husband, George Hiram Boyd, lost most of her $400,000 fortune ($ million today) to bad investments, she divorced him in 1940.

She wrote her last screenplay for the 1947 movie That's My Man and disappeared at age 53. She had been having poor health. She was never heard from again, and there is no known record of her death.

Partial filmography

 Footlights and Shadows (1920)
 The Girl from Nowhere (1921)
 Lying Lips (1921)
 I Am Guilty (1921)
 Beyond the Crossroads (1922)
 A Man of Action (1923)
 Anna Christie (1923)
 Christine of the Hungry Heart (1924)
 The Chorus Lady (1924)
 Enticement (1925)
 When the Door Opened (1925)
 The Gilded Butterfly (1926)
 The Palace of Pleasure (1926)
 Hell's Four Hundred (1926)
 The Return of Peter Grimm (1926)
 The Lovelorn (1927)
 Under the Black Eagle (1928)
 Diamond Handcuffs (1928)
 Scarlet Seas (1929)
 Drag (1929)
 Weary River (1929)
 The Squall (1929)
 Young Nowheres (1929)
 Drag (1929)
 Dark Streets (1929)
 Son of the Gods (1930)
 Wild Company (1930)
 The Way of All Men (1930)
 The Lash (1930)
 The Mask Falls (1931)
 A Passport to Hell (1932)
 Six Hours to Live (1932)
 Humanity (1933)
 Let's Live Tonight (1935)
 Maid of Salem (1937)

References

External links 

Bradley King at Women Film Pioneers Project

1894 births
1977 deaths
American women screenwriters
20th-century American women writers
Screenwriters from Illinois
People from Chicago
Writers from Chicago
20th-century American screenwriters